Joel Zito Araújo is a Brazilian film director, writer and producer of films and TV programs. Since 1984, Araújo has produced  one feature film, two short films and 25 documentaries. Some of these works have won prizes or been selected for screenings at film festivals throughout the world. From 2006 to 2007, Araújo was president of the Brazilian Filmmakers Association. He received his Ph.D. in Communication Sciences from the Escola de Comunicações e Artes at the University of São Paulo in 1999. He was Postdoctoral Fellow and Visiting Professor in the Departments of Radio, TV, and Film and Anthropology as well as the Center for African & African-American Studies at the University of Texas at Austin from August 2001 to May 2002.

Filmography 
"Raça" Full-length documentary co-produced with the North American production company Principe Productions Inc. (New York). Directed by Joel Zito Araujo and Megan Mylan Oscar Winner for Best Short Documentary 2009. World Premiere as Hors Concurs at the 2012 Rio de Janeiro International Film Festival (October 10, 2012). Selected at the FESPACO 2013 – Pan African Film Festival of Ouagadougou (February 2013). Selected at the 35 Festival Internacional del Nuevo Cine Latinoamericano -  sessão LATINOAMÉRICA EN PERSPECTIVA. Havana/Cuba - Dez/2013.Selected at the Toulouse Cinelatino Film Festival 2014.
Daughters of the Wind (As Filhas do Vento) won eight prizes at the 32nd Gramado Film Festival (known as the most important Film Festival in Brazil) in August 2004. Awarded by that Festival jury, the prizes were: Best Director, Best Actor, Best Actress, Best Supporting Actress, Best Supporting Actor and Best Film by the Critics Review. This film also received the Best Film award at the 8th Mostra de Filme de Tiradentes, Minas Gerais in January 2005 and the Best Full-Length Script award at the Second Paratycine Festival, 2005. It also earned the Best Actor and Best Actress awards from the Festival de Cinema de Macapá, in 2005.
Cinderellas, Wolves and one Enchanted Prince (Cinderelas, Lobos e um Príncipe Encantado) (107 minutes, HD) was awarded an Honorable Mention at the X Brasília International Film Festival in 2008. It also received the Best Film and the Best Director awards at the 9th Iberoamerican Film Festival of Sergipe (Curta-SE9) in 2009, and the Best Full-Length Documentary prize (from audience) and Honourable Mention from Jury at the VII Mostra Vidas na Tela – Natal. 2009.
Denying Brazil (A Negação do Brasil) (91 minutes, 35 mm)was awarded a prize by the Brazilian Ministry of Culture, which sponsored the 1999 National Documentary Competition.  In 2001, this film received the "Best Brazilian Film award", "the Best Research award" and the Quanta Prize at the 6th International Documentary Festival It's All True- É Tudo Verdade, a Festival that takes place in São Paulo and Rio de Janeiro. It also earned the “Gilberto Freire Film” award and "Best Full-Length Documentary Script award" from the 5th Recife Film Festival in 2001.

Bibliography 
"A Negação do Brasil – o negro na história da telenovela brasileira" (The denial of Brazil – blacks in the history of Brazilian soap operas). São Paulo: Ed. Senac, November 2000, 323 pp.
"O Negro na TV Pública" (The Black People on Brazilian PBS). Brasília: Fundação Cultural Palmares, 2010.
"L’arrivée sous tension de réalisateurs noirs au Brésil au cours des 30 dernières années. (Cinémas d’amérique latine – Revue annuelle de l’Association Rencontres Cinemas d’Amerique Latine de Tolouse-(ARCAL – número 26) março 2018.
"As escolas do cinema africano. Conjunto de artigos para a revista especial África cinema, um olhar contemporâneo. RJ: Junho de 2015. Ferreira, Leonardo Luiz (org.) 
"O Negro na TV: já dá para comemorar o fim do preconceito? In: Revista Caros Amigos. Ano XV – Especial Mídia. No. 52, Abril 2011.
"O Negro na Telenovela Brasileira: Uma Síntese". The Afro-Brazilian Mind: Contemporary Afro-Brazilian Literary and Cultural Criticism, edited by Niyi Afolobi, Márcio Barbosa, & Esmeralda Ribeiro, pp. 257–270. Africa World Press, Inc. Trenton, NJ. 2007.
"Le noir dans les feuilletons televises". In: Cinémas d'amérique latine – Revue annuelle de l’Association Rencontres Cinemas d'Amerique Latine de Tolouse (ARCAL), no. 15. pp. 17–27. 2007
"Televisão e Racismo" ("Television and racism"), Tempo e Presença journal, n. 315, Rio de Janeiro: Ed. Koinonia, January–February 2001.
"Identidade Racial e Estereótipos sobre o Negro na TV Brasileira" ("Racial identity and stereotypes about blacks on Brazilian TV"). In: Guimarães, A. S. A. & Huntley, Lynn (org.), Tirando a Máscara: Ensaios sobre o Racismo no Brasil. Rio de Janeiro: Paz e Terra, 2000.
"Por uma Estratégia para a Inserção dos Afro-Brasileiros na Mídia" ("Towards a strategy for including Afro-Brazilians in the media"). In: Anais do Seminário Ética e Estética Multiracial Brasil-África do Sul. Seminar held in Brasília and São Paulo on 16 & 17 December 1996. Brasília: Fundação Cultural Palmares /Ministério da Cultura, 1997.
"Estratégias e Políticas de Combate à Discriminação Racial na Mídia" ("Strategies and policies for combating racial discrimination in the media"). In: Estratégias e Políticas de Combate à Discriminação Racial (Org. Kabengele Munanga). São Paulo: Edusp/Estação Ciência, 1996.

External links

"FILM REVIEW; An Estrangement Crosses Generations, Shadowed by Race-NYT"
"Brazilian Documentary Filmmaker Joel Zito Araújo Headlines Diaspora Fest and Symposium on Black and Independent Film"
"Multiracial Brazil Planning Quotas for Blacks - NYT" 

Living people
Brazilian film directors
Brazilian film producers
Year of birth missing (living people)